Corymbia ferruginea, commonly known as the rusty bloodwood, is a species of tree that is endemic to northern Australia. It has rough, tessellated bark on the trunk and branches, a crown of sessile juvenile leaves, flower buds in groups of three or seven, pale creamy yellow flowers and urn-shaped fruit.

Description
Flowering occurs from January to April and the flowers are pale creamy yellow.

Taxonomy and naming
Rusty bloodwood was first formally described in 1843 by Johannes Conrad Schauer in Walpers' book Repertorium Botanices Systematicae and given the name Eucalyptus ferruginea. In 1995, Ken Hill and Lawrie Johnson changed the name to Corymbia ferruginea.

In the same journal, Hill and Johnson described two subspecies and the names are accepted by the Australian Plant Census:
 Corymbia ferruginea (Schauer) K.D.Hill & L.A.S.Johnson subsp. ferruginea;

Distribution and habitat
Corymbia ferruginea grows in open forest and woodland on shallow, sandstone soils or deep sands from west of Fitzroy Crossing in Western Australia then east through the northern part of the Northern Territory to south of Burketown in north-west Queensland.

See also
 List of Corymbia species

References

ferruginea
Myrtales of Australia
Flora of Western Australia
Flora of Queensland
Flora of the Northern Territory
Plants described in 1843